Kaduna kidnapping may refer to:

Afaka kidnapping
Greenfield University kidnapping